

Crown
Head of state (monarch) – Queen Elizabeth II

Federal government
Governor General - Jules Léger then Edward Richard Schreyer

Cabinet
Prime Minister - Pierre Trudeau then Joe Clark
Deputy Prime Minister - Allan MacEachen then Vacant 
Minister of Finance - Jean Chrétien then John Crosbie 
Secretary of State for External Affairs - Don Jamieson then Flora McDonald 
Secretary of State for Canada - John Roberts then David MacDonald 
Minister of the Environment - Roméo LeBlanc then Leonard Marchand then John Allen Fraser
Minister of Justice - Marc Lalonde then Jacques Flynn
Minister of National Defence - Barney Danson then Allan McKinnon 
Minister of Health and Welfare - Monique Bégin then David Edward Crombie 
Minister of Regional Economic Expansion - Marcel Lessard then Vacant then Elmer MacKay
Minister of Transport - Otto Lang then Don Mazankowski
Minister of Communications - Jeanne Sauvé then David MacDonald
Minister of Fisheries and Oceans - Roméo LeBlanc then James McGrath
Minister of Public Works - André Ouellet then Erik Nielsen
Minister of Employment and Immigration - Bud Cullen then Ron Atkey
Minister of Indian Affairs and Northern Development - James Hugh Faulkner then Jake Epp
Minister of Energy, Mines and Resources - Alastair Gillespie then Ramon John Hnatyshyn

Parliament
See: 31st Canadian parliament

Party leaders
Liberal Party of Canada - Pierre Trudeau
New Democratic Party- Ed Broadbent
Progressive Conservative Party - Joe Clark

Supreme Court Justices
Chief Justice: Bora Laskin
William McIntyre
Ronald Martland
Louis-Philippe Pigeon
Roland Almon Ritchie
Willard Estey
Jean Beetz
Julien Chouinard
Brian Dickson

Other
Speaker of the House of Commons - James Jerome
Governor of the Bank of Canada - Gerald Bouey
Chief of the Defence Staff - Air General Robert Hilborn Falls

Provinces

Premiers
Premier of Alberta - Peter Lougheed
Premier of British Columbia - Bill Bennett
Premier of Manitoba - Sterling Lyon
Premier of New Brunswick - Richard Hatfield
Premier of Newfoundland - Frank Moores then Brian Peckford
Premier of Nova Scotia - John Buchanan
Premier of Ontario - Bill Davis
Premier of Prince Edward Island - Bennett Campbell then Angus MacLean
Premier of Quebec - René Lévesque
Premier of Saskatchewan - Allan Blakeney

Lieutenant-governors
Lieutenant-Governor of Alberta - Frank C. Lynch-Staunton
Lieutenant-Governor of British Columbia - Henry Pybus Bell-Irving
Lieutenant-Governor of Manitoba - Francis Lawrence Jobin
Lieutenant-Governor of New Brunswick - Hédard Robichaud
Lieutenant-Governor of Newfoundland and Labrador - Gordon Arnaud Winter
Lieutenant-Governor of Nova Scotia - John Elvin Shaffner
Lieutenant-Governor of Ontario - Pauline Mills McGibbon
Lieutenant-Governor of Prince Edward Island - Gordon Lockhart Bennett
Lieutenant-Governor of Quebec - Jean-Pierre Côté
Lieutenant-Governor of Saskatchewan - Irwin McIntosh

Mayors
Toronto - John Sewell
Montreal - Jean Drapeau
Vancouver - Jack Volrich
Ottawa - Marion Dewar

See also

Events in Canada in 1979
 Governmental leaders in 1979
 Canadian incumbents by year

1979
Incumbents
Canadian leaders